Iringa Mvumi is an administrative ward in the Dodoma Rural district of the Dodoma Region of Tanzania. According to the 2012 census, the ward's total population was 11,313.

References

Wards of Dodoma Region